The Córdoba vesper mouse or Córdoba laucha (Calomys venustus) is a South American rodent species of the family Cricetidae. It is endemic to the area of Córdoba Province, central Argentina, where it is found in the espinal (dry lowland thorn brush and grassland).

References 

Mammals of Argentina
Calomys
Mammals described in 1894
Taxa named by Oldfield Thomas